Francisco Joaquim Ferreira do Amaral, GCTE (Lisbon, Santa Catarina, 11 June 1843 – 11 August 1923) was a Portuguese naval commander and politician.

Parents
He was the only son of João Maria Ferreira do Amaral and his wife Maria Helena de Albuquerque, 1st Baroness of Oliveira Lima.

Career
He distinguished himself as a military and became a vice-admiral and admiral of the Portuguese Navy, conquering important territories in Cabinda, Angola. For his successes, the realm wanted to grant him the title of count, which he refused, suggesting that it would be better to grant it to his mother instead, who would be happier with it.

He served as a Peer of the Realm by Royal Letter of 17 March 1898, Member of the Council of His Most Faithful Majesty, Minister of State and the first President of the Council of Ministers of Manuel II of Portugal, or 75th Prime Minister of Portugal, Deputy of the Nation, Governor of Moçâmedes, Governor of São Tomé e Príncipe, 78th Governor of Angola (1882–1886) (1882–1886) and 101st Governor of the State of India (1886–1886), president of the Society of Geography, 308th Grand Cross of the Order of the Tower and Sword, etc. He was also created an Honorary Knight Commander of the Royal Victorian Order.

Marriage and issue

He married in Lisbon, São Julião, on 12 September 1880 Carolina Amélia Bastos (Lisbon, Santa Justa, 4 November 1852 – Goa, India, 22 October 1886), daughter of António Inácio Bastos and his wife Maria Cristina da Conceição Tibau, and had three children: 
 João Maria Basto Ferreira do Amaral (1881 – 27 September 1884)
 Maria Cristina Basto Ferreira do Amaral (Luanda, 18 March 1883 – Penamacor, Aldeia de João Pires, 15 September 1960), married António Emídio Taborda de Azevedo e Costa (Penamacor, Penamacor – Penamacor, Aldeia de João Pires), and had issue
 Augusto Basto Ferreira do Amaral (Nova Goa, Goa, India, 17 October 1886 – Lisbon, São Sebastião da Pedreira, 10 February 1947)

Illegitimate issue
Before marriage, he had two more recognized children.

At age 18, he impregnated a servant from his house (who was also the mistress and later second wife of his first cousin Guilherme de Albuquerque Carvalhal e França, by whom she had Júlio de Albuquerque e França), which scandal led them both to be expelled from their home, and had one daughter: 
 Serícia Emília Ferreira do Amaral (Lisbon, September 1861 – ?), unmarried and without issue

By Augusta Frederica Smith Chaves (c. 1850 – after 1923), of English descent, he had one son: 
 João Maria Ferreira do Amaral (Lisbon, São Julião, 14 June 1876 – Lisbon, 11 March/3 November 1931)

References and notes

 GeneAll.net – Francisco Joaquim Ferreira do Amaral at www.geneall.net Francisco Joaquim Ferreira do Amaral

Sources
 Anuário da Nobreza de Portugal, III, 1985, Tomo II, pp. 758–761

Prime Ministers of Portugal
Portuguese colonial governors and administrators
Naval ministers of Portugal
1843 births
1923 deaths
People from Lisbon
Portuguese admirals
Governors of Portuguese Angola
1880s in Angola
Governors of Portuguese São Tomé and Príncipe
Honorary Knights Commander of the Royal Victorian Order
19th-century Portuguese military personnel
19th-century Portuguese politicians
20th-century Portuguese people